Vojtaššák is a Slovak surname. Notable people with the surname include:

Ján Vojtaššák (1877–1965), Slovak bishop
 Patrik Vojtaššák (born 1992), Slovak ice hockey player

Slovak-language surnames